Hanif means a true believer, a righteous person in Arabic. It is the surname of the following people:
Aamer Hanif (born 1967), Pakistani cricketer
Abdullah Hanif (born 1982), Emirati cricketer 
Adil Hanif (born 1978), Pakistani-born Bahraini cricketer
Mohammad Hanif (disambiguation)
Mohammed Hanif (born 1964), British Pakistani writer and journalist 
Rashid Hanif, Bangladeshi cricketer 
Saqib Hanif, Pakistani football player